{{DISPLAYTITLE:Iota2 Normae}}

ι2 Normae, Latinised as Iota2 Normae, is a single, blue-white star located in the southern constellation of Norma. It is positioned to the west of Rigil Kentaurus but can be difficult to spot against the Milky Way. It is faintly visible to the naked eye with an apparent visual magnitude of +5.57. At that distance, the visual magnitude is diminished by an interstellar extinction factor of 0.24 due to intervening dust. The radial velocity of this star is zero, indicating it is neither moving toward nor away from the Sun.

Iota2 Normae is a B-type main-sequence star with a stellar classification of B9.5 V. It is larger than the Sun with 2.6 times the mass of the Sun and about 3.1 times the Sun's radius. The star is estimated to be 257 million years old and is spinning with a projected rotational velocity of 111 km/s. It is radiating approximately 40 times the Sun's luminosity from its photosphere at an effective temperature of 10,593 Kelvin.

References

External links
Alcyone page 

Normae, Iota2
Norma (constellation)
Normae, Iota2
Durchmusterung objects
144480
5994
079153